Ashibusa jezoensis is a moth of the family Cosmopterigidae. It is found in Japan, Taiwan and on the Kuriles.

The wingspan is about 15 mm.

References

Moths described in 1931
Cosmopteriginae
Moths of Asia